The Public Worship Regulation Act 1874 (37 & 38 Vict c 85) was an Act of Parliament of the United Kingdom, introduced as a Private Member's Bill by Archbishop of Canterbury Archibald Campbell Tait, to limit what he perceived as the growing ritualism of Anglo-Catholicism and the Oxford Movement within the Church of England. The bill was strongly endorsed by Prime Minister Benjamin Disraeli, and vigorously opposed by Liberal party leader William Ewart Gladstone. Queen Victoria strongly supported it. The law was seldom enforced, but at least five clergymen were imprisoned by judges for contempt of court, which greatly embarrassed the Church of England archbishops who had vigorously promoted it.

Tait's bill 
Tait's bill was controversial.  It was given government backing by Prime Minister Benjamin Disraeli, who called it "a bill to put down ritualism".  He referred to the practices of the Oxford Movement as "a Mass in masquerade".  Queen Victoria was supportive of the Act's Protestant intentions.  Liberal leader William Ewart Gladstone, a high church Anglican whose sympathies were for separation of church and state, felt disgusted that the liturgy was made, as he saw it, "a parliamentary football".

The Act 
Before the Act, the Church of England regulated its worship practices through the Court of Arches with appeal to the Judicial Committee of the Privy Council. The Act established a new court, presided over by former Divorce Court judge Lord Penzance.  Many citizens were scandalised by parliamentary interference with worship and, moreover, by its proposed supervision by a secular court.  The act gave bishops the discretionary power to order a stay of proceedings.

Section 8 of the Act allowed an archdeacon, church warden or three adult male parishioners of a parish to serve on the bishop a representation that in their opinion:

The bishop had the discretion to stay proceedings but, if he allowed them to proceed, the parties had the opportunity to submit to his direction with no right of appeal. The bishop was able to issue a monition, but if the parties did not agree to his jurisdiction, then the matter was to be sent for trial (section 9).

The Act provided a casus belli for the Anglo-Catholic English Church Union and the evangelical Church Association. Many clergy were brought to trial and five ultimately imprisoned for contempt of court.

List of clergy imprisoned 
 Revd Arthur Tooth, Vicar of St James's, Hatcham, 1877
 Revd T. Pelham Dale, Rector of St Vedast Foster Lane, in the City of London, 1880
 Revd Richard William Enraght, Rector of Holy Trinity, Bordesley, West Midlands, 1880
 Revd Sidney Faithorn Green, Rector of St John's, Miles Platting, Manchester, 1881–82
 Revd James Bell Cox, Vicar of St Margaret's, Liverpool, 1887

These clergy were supported financially by George Boyle, 6th Earl of Glasgow, who donated considerable sums to their defence and compensation.

Prosecutions ended when a Royal Commission in 1906 recognised the legitimacy of pluralism in worship, but the Act remained in force for 91 years until it was repealed on 1 March 1965 by the Ecclesiastical Jurisdiction Measure 1963.

Territorial extent 
The Act extended to England, the Channel Islands and the Isle of Man.

See also 
Anglican eucharistic theology

References

Citations

Sources

Further reading

 
 , a standard scholarly history of the act.
 
 Graber, Gary W. Ritual Legislation in the Victorian Church of England: Antecedents and Passage of the Public Worship Regulation Act, 1874 (1993) online review; a standard scholarly history of the act.
 Janes, Dominic. "The 'Modern Martyrdom' of Anglo-Catholics in Victorian England." Journal of Religion and Society 13 (2011) online.
 Janes, Dominic. Victorian Reformation: The Fight over Idolatry in the Church of England, 1840-1860 (Oxford University Press, 2009). 
 Latourette, Kenneth Scott. Christianity in a Revolutionary Age: The 19th century in Europe volume 2 (1959) p. 270-279.
 Reed, John Shelton. Glorious Battle: The Cultural Politics of Victorian Anglo-Catholicism (London: Tufton Books, 1998).
 Roberts, Andrew. Salisbury: Victorian Titan (1999) pp. 135–138.
 Royal Commission on Ecclesiastical Discipline (1906) Report of the Royal Commission on Ecclesiastical Discipline
 Shannon, Richard. The Age of Disraeli, 1868-1881: The Rise of Tory Democracy (1992) pp. 199–210.
 

1874 in Christianity
1874 in British law
Acts of the Parliament of the United Kingdom concerning England
Anglicanism
Anglo-Catholicism
Christianity and law in the 19th century
History of the Church of England
Law about religion in the United Kingdom
United Kingdom Acts of Parliament 1874